Marshall Younger (born 21 June 1939) is a former Australian rules footballer who played with South Melbourne in the Victorian Football League (VFL).

Sources
 Holmesby, Russell & Main, Jim (2007). The Encyclopedia of AFL Footballers. 7th ed. Melbourne: Bas Publishing.

External links
 
 

1939 births
Sydney Swans players
Living people
Australian rules footballers from Ballarat